No Wave is the debut album by James Blood Ulmer's Music Revelation Ensemble featuring saxophonist David Murray, bassist Amin Ali and drummer Ronald Shannon Jackson, recorded in 1980 and released on the German Moers Music label.

Track listing
All compositions by James Blood Ulmer
 "Time Table" – 10:00
 "Big Tree" – 8:45
 "Baby Talk" – 9:36
 "Sound Check" – 8:06

Personnel
James Blood Ulmer - guitar
David Murray - tenor saxophone
Amin Ali - electric bass
Ronald Shannon Jackson - drums, percussion

References 

1980 albums
James Blood Ulmer albums
Moers Music albums